Liu Gonghui is currently President of Beijing University of Technology, located in Beijing, China.

Early life
Liu completed his master's degree in mechanical engineering at China University of Mining and Technology in 1989.
In 1992, he received his Ph.D. degree in mechanical engineering from the same university. From 1992–1994, he did his postdoc work
at Beihang University.

Career
In 1994, Liu joined China University of Petroleum as an assistant professor. He was later promoted to professor and deputy president. In 2007, he was appointed president of Beijing Union University. In 2011, he became president of Beijing Information Science and Technology University. In 2015, he became president of Beijing University of Technology. In 2018, he established a collaboration agreement with University of Silesia in Katowice, Poland

Awards
In 2011, Liu was awarded the honorary doctor of science degree from Anglia Ruskin University, UK.

References

1963 births
Living people
Chinese educators
Chinese mechanical engineers
China University of Mining and Technology alumni
Presidents of Beijing University of Technology